Fisayo Akinade (born 28 December 1987) is a British actor, best known for his roles as Dean Monroe in Cucumber and Banana on Channel 4 and Mr. Ajayi in the popular Netflix series Heartstopper, as well as his work in theatre.

Early life and education
Akinade was born in Liverpool. He spent four years of his childhood in Nigeria before returning to the UK where he grew up in the Fallowfield and Moss Side areas of Manchester.

He wanted to be a gymnast growing up. However, after suffering injury, and the closure of the place where he practiced, Akinade began attending drop-in drama classes at the Contact Theatre, later joining the Contact Young Actors Company, and workshops at the Royal Exchange Theatre. He went on to train at the Royal Central School of Speech and Drama in London.

Career
Akinade's television breakthrough came in 2015, when he starred as Dean Monroe in Russell T Davies' drama Cucumber and its offshoots Banana and Tofu. In 2016, Akinade starred alongside Glenn Close, Gemma Arterton and Paddy Considine in The Girl with All the Gifts.

In February 2022, Akinade starred in Alistair McDowall's play The Glow. The play was performed at Royal Court Theatre Downstairs. Akinade featured in the Netflix series Heartstopper, which was released in April 2022. In the series, he plays Nathan Ajayi. In November 2022, Akinade starred as Chevalier de Saint-Jacques in Starz drama Dangerous Liaisons, alongside Alice Englert, Nicholas Denton and Lesley Manville. Dangerous Liaisons'' was picked up for a second series.

Personal life
Akinade is gay.

Filmography

Film

Television

Web

Video games

Awards and nominations

References

External links 
 

Living people
1987 births
20th-century British LGBT people
21st-century British actors
21st-century LGBT people
Alumni of the Royal Central School of Speech and Drama
Black British male actors
English gay actors
English people of Nigerian descent
English LGBT actors
LGBT Black British people
Male actors from Liverpool
Male actors from Manchester
People from Fallowfield
People from Moss Side